Carcinoembryonic antigen-related cell adhesion molecule 1 (biliary glycoprotein) (CEACAM1) also known as CD66a (Cluster of Differentiation 66a), is a human glycoprotein, and a member of the carcinoembryonic antigen (CEA) gene family.

Function 

This gene encodes a member of the carcinoembryonic antigen (CEA) gene family, which belongs to the immunoglobulin superfamily. Two subgroups of the CEA family, the CEA cell adhesion molecules and the pregnancy-specific glycoproteins, are located within a 1.2 Mb cluster on the long arm of chromosome 19. Eleven pseudogenes of the CEA cell adhesion molecule subgroup are also found in the cluster. The encoded protein was originally described in bile ducts of liver as biliary glycoprotein. Subsequently, it was found to be a cell–cell adhesion molecule detected on leukocytes, epithelia, and endothelia. The encoded protein mediates cell adhesion via homophilic as well as heterophilic binding to other proteins of the subgroup. Multiple cellular activities have been attributed to the encoded protein, including roles in the differentiation and arrangement of tissue three-dimensional structure, angiogenesis, apoptosis, tumor suppression, metastasis, and the modulation of innate and adaptive immune responses. Multiple transcript variants encoding different isoforms have been reported, but the full-length nature of only two has been determined.

In melanocytic cells CEACAM1 gene expression may be regulated by MITF.

Interactions 

CEACAM1 has been shown to interact with PTPN11 and Annexin A2.

See also 
 Carcinoembryonic antigen
 Cluster of differentiation

References

Further reading

External links 
 
 

Clusters of differentiation